The 2017 Women's Rugby League World Cup was the fifth staging of the Women's Rugby League World Cup and was held in Australia between 16 November and 2 December 2017. Pool and semi-final matches was held at Southern Cross Group Stadium in Sydney, with the final held at Brisbane Stadium. The final was played as a double-header with the men's final.

Teams

Qualifying
Five teams (Australia, New Zealand, England, Papua New Guinea, and Canada) qualified automatically for the World Cup. 

Pre-tournament matches 
Before the World Cup it was announced that France would host England in two tests in Perpignan, and Papua New Guinea would host Australia in Port Moresby.

Squads

Venues 
All the matches were played at Endeavour Field (Southern Cross Group Stadium) in Sydney, with the exception of the final which was played in the larger Brisbane Stadium in Brisbane.

Pool stage 
The two pools feature three teams each. The top two teams in each pool will qualify for the semi-finals. Pool play will involve a round robin with an additional inter-pool game for each team so all teams will play three pool games.

Pool A

Australia v. Cook Islands

Australia v. England

England v. Cook Islands

Pool B

New Zealand v. Canada

Papua New Guinea v. Canada

New Zealand v. Papua New Guinea

Inter-pool matches

England v. Papua New Guinea

New Zealand v. Cook Islands

Australia v. Canada

Knockout stage

Semi-finals

Final: Australia v New Zealand

Try scorers
13
 Honey Hireme

6
 Karina Brown
 Isabelle Kelly
5
 Krystal Murray
 Elianna Walton
4
 Vanessa Foliaki
 Lilieta Maumau
 Natasha Smith
 Caitlyn Moran
 Raecene McGregor
3

 Chelsea Baker
 Ali Brigginshaw
 Nakia Davis-Welsh
 Teuila Fotu-Moala
 Zahara Temara
 Meg Ward
 Shontelle Woodman

2

 Charlotte Booth
 Matiua Feterika
 Steph Hancock
 Amy Hardcastle
 Amber Kani
 Corban McGregor
 Hilda Peters
 Talesha Quinn
 Ruan Sims
 Tara-Jane Stanley
 Atawhai Tupaea

1

 Racquel Anderson
 Kezie Apps
 Katelyn Arona
 Danielle Bound
 Brittany Breayley
 Christie Bulhage
 Kayleigh Bulman
 Luisa Gago
 Shona Hoyle
 Chantelle Inangaro Schofield
 Martha Karl
 Naomi Kaupa
 Beniamina Koiatu
 Laura Mariu
 Nita Maynard
 Sabrina McDaid
 Te Amohaere Ngata-Aerengamate
 Apii Nicholls-Pualau
 Annetta Nuuausala
 Anne Oiufa
 Lavina O'Mealey
 Megan Pakulis
 Emma Slowe
 Cecelia Strickland
 Maddie Studdon
 Beth Sutcliffe

Broadcasting

See also

Women's rugby league

References

External links

Women's Rugby League World Cup
World Cup
Rugby League World Cup
Rugby League World Cup
Women's Rugby League World Cup
International rugby league competitions hosted by Australia
Women's Rugby League World Cup
Women's rugby league in Australia
Sports competitions in Brisbane
Sports competitions in Sydney